Leonid Georgyevich Gubanov (July 20, 1946 – September 8, 1983) was a  Soviet  poet, creator of  unofficial literary circle SMOG.

Biography
He began writing poetry since childhood. In 1962 he entered the literary studio at the district library. Several of his poems were published in the newspaper Pionerskaya Pravda. Then he became interested in futurism and created a neo-futuristic samizdat magazine. 

Then he entered the literary studio of the Moscow Palace of Pioneers. Famous poets paid attention to him. In 1964, Yevgeny Yevtushenko helped to print an excerpt from a poem by Leonid Gubanov in the magazine Yunost. This publication was the last publication of Leonid Gubanov in the Soviet press.

In early 1965, together with Vladimir Aleinikov, Vladimir Batshev, Yuri Kublanovsky and others, he participated in the creation of the independent literary and artistic association SMOG.

On December 5, 1965, he took part in a glasnost meeting on Pushkin Square in Moscow. After some time, he was forcibly incarcerated in a special Soviet "psychiatric hospital". 

During the era of stagnation, Leonid Gubanov did not take part in official literary life. He earned his living by unskilled labor (he was a working geophysical expedition, photo lab assistant, fireman, graphic designer, janitor, loader). 

He died on September 8, 1983 at the age of thirty-seven, buried in Moscow at the Khovanskoye Cemetery.

In 1994, the first compilation of Leonid Gubanov, The Angel in the Snow, was published by the publishing house IMA-PRESS.

Personal life
He was married to  poetess   (1943 — 2018).

Books 
 The Angel in the Snow (1994)
 I am Exiled to the Muse on Galleys... (2001)
 Gray Horse (2006)
 And Invited Words to Feast... (2012)

References

External links
  45-я параллель 

1946 births
1983 deaths
Soviet male poets
20th-century Russian poets
Russian-language poets
Writers from Moscow
Soviet dissidents